Beauxart Gardens is an unincorporated community and census-designated place (CDP) in eastern Jefferson County, Texas. It is located between U.S. Highway 69, U.S. Highway 96, U.S. Highway 287, and Spur 93. The community is six miles (10 km) southeast of downtown Beaumont and slightly to the west of Southeast Texas Regional Airport. It is across a highway from the Unincorporated community of Viterbo. It was first listed as a CDP in the 2020 census with a population of 1,064.

At one time residents of Nederland and Viterbo used sites in Beauxart Gardens for rice farming. The Federal Government of the United States developed Beauxart Gardens during the Great Depression. The community was named for its location between Beaumont and Port Arthur. The town plat, filed in 1934, was approved by the Resettlement Administration in 1935. The  tract housed 50 families. Each house had three to six rooms and three and one half acres of land; each household was permitted to use the land in any manner. Many of the residents held part-time jobs at refineries. For the remainder of each year, they worked in the Beauxart Gardens government truck farm. On August 10, 1942, a voting precinct was established in the community.

References

External links
 

Unincorporated communities in Jefferson County, Texas
Unincorporated communities in Texas
Census-designated places in Texas
Census-designated places in Jefferson County, Texas
Populated places established in 1934
New Deal subsistence homestead communities
New Deal in Texas